Pusionella valida is a species of sea snail, a marine gastropod mollusk in the family Clavatulidae.

Description
The size of an adult shell varies between 30 mm and 40 mm. The shell is smooth and ponderous. There are 11–12 whorls, flatly rounded, with two or three striae around the upper portion, and several at the base of the body whorl. The color of the shell is light yellowish brown.

Distribution
This species occurs in the Pacific Ocean. This ascription is uncertain as this marine species probably occurs from West African to Namibia

References

  Dautzenberg, Ph. - Mission Gruvel sur la còte occidentale d'Afrique; Paris :Masson et cie 1912, p. 8 (described as Pusionella haasi)
 Cernohorsky W. O. (1984). Systematics of the family Nassariidae (Mollusca: Gastropoda). Bulletin of the Auckland Institute and Museum 14: 1–356
 Gofas, S.; Afonso, J.P.; Brandào, M. (Ed.). (S.a.). Conchas e Moluscos de Angola = Coquillages et Mollusques d'Angola. [Shells and molluscs of Angola]. Universidade Agostinho / Elf Aquitaine Angola: Angola. 140 pp
 Nolf F. (2010) Pusionella haasi Dautzenberg, 1912 a junior synonym of Pusionella valida (Dunker, 1852) (Mollusca: Gastropoda: Clavatulidae). Neptunea 9(4): 1–10

External links
 
 Syntype in the MNHN, Paris

valida
Gastropods described in 1852